Envases Venezolanos (BVC: VZL.A) is a holding company producer and marketer of tinplate cans and lids, as well as glass products for industrial and domestic use. The company produces tin plates and lids used by food processing companies and manufactures of drinks. It also produces tin plates and lids for companies that specialize in the production of paints, solvents and asphalt products and other industries.

References

External links 

Manufacturing companies of Venezuela
Glassmaking companies
Manufacturing companies established in 1952
Companies listed on the Caracas Stock Exchange
Venezuelan brands